Acroncosa castrella is a species of snout moth in the genus Acroncosa. It was described by William Barnes and James Halliday McDunnough in 1917. It is found in North America, including the type location of New Mexico.

Taxonomy
It was previously treated as a subspecies of Acroncosa albiflavella.

References

Moths described in 1917
Phycitinae
Moths of North America